The Dana Owens Album is the fifth studio album by American hip hop artist Queen Latifah. The album was released on September 28, 2004 through A&M Records. The album marks a departure from her previous hip-hop releases, and is composed of jazz, soul, and R&B covers of songs by artists such as Al Green, Bill Withers, and Screamin' Jay Hawkins, among others. The album reached No. 16 on the Billboard 200 and No. 11 on the Top R&B/Hip-Hop Albums chart.

Overview
The Dana Owens Album is a cover album of jazz and R&B songs entitled after Latifah's birth name, Dana Elaine Owens. Unlike Latifah's previous hip hop/R&B-oriented albums, this album showcases a jazz vocal performance.

The LP earned a Grammy nomination in 2005 in the category of Best Jazz Vocal Album. The album has also been certified gold in the United States by the Recording Industry Association of America (RIAA).

Track listing 
 "Baby Get Lost" (Leonard Feather) – 3:42
 "I Put a Spell on You" (Screamin' Jay Hawkins) – 3:08
 "Simply Beautiful" (Al Green) – 4:11
 "The Same Love That Made Me Laugh" (Bill Withers) – 3:53
 "Moody's Mood for Love" (James Moody, Dorothy Fields, Jimmy McHugh) – 3:59
 "Close Your Eyes" (Bernice Petkere) – 2:55
 "California Dreamin'" (John Phillips, Michelle Phillips) – 3:42
 "Hard Times" (Stony Browder, August Darnell) – 5:21
 "Mercy, Mercy, Mercy" (Gail Fisher, Vincent Levy, Joe Zawinul) – 3:27
 "Hello Stranger" (Barbara Lewis) – 3:00
 "If I Had You" (Jimmy Campbell, Reginald Connelly, Ted Shapiro) – 4:04
 "Lush Life" (Billy Strayhorn) – 4:25

Personnel

Main personnel
Queen Latifah – vocals
Bryant Breyers – trombone
Pete Christlieb – saxophone
Vinnie Colaiuta – drums
Luis Conte – percussion
Jim Cox –           Fender Rhodes, piano, Wurlitzer
Charles Davis – trumpet
Peter Erskine – drums
Brandon Fields – saxophone
John Goux – guitar
Gary Grant – horn, trumpet
Dan Higgins –      horn, saxophone
Larry Lunetta –     trumpet
Richard Taylor "Dick" Nash – trombone
David "Fathead" Newman –  vocals
Bruce Otto – trombone
Joel Peskin – saxophone
Mervyn Warren – piano, scat

Guest artists
Al Green – vocals
Herbie Hancock – piano
James Moody – alto saxophone

Session musicians
Nico Abondolo – string bass
Robert Adcock – cello
Eun Mee Ahn – violin
Richard Altenbach – violin
Jerry Barnes – bass
Sherrod Barnes – guitar
Robert Becker – viola
Emily Bernstein – clarinet
Gary Bias – saxophone
Charlie Bisharat – violin
Tom Boyd – oboe
Jacqueline Brand – violin
Denyse Buffum – viola
Bob Burns, Jr. – trumpet
Darius Campo – violin
Roberto Cani – violin
Tim Carmon – organ
Lily Ho Chen – violin
Ronald Clark – violin
Jon Clarke – English horn
Durell Coleman – backing vocals
Larry Corbett – cello
Brian Dembow – viola
Joel Derouin – violin
Yvette Devereaux – violin
Bruce Dukov – violin
Arni Egilsson – string bass
Stephen Erdody – cello
Charles Everett – violin
Marlow Fisher – viola
Samuel Formicola – viola
Matthew Funes – viola
Armen Garabedian – violin
Berj Garabedia – violin
Tom Garvin – piano
Gordon Gottlieb – percussion
Endre Granat – violin
Alan Grunfeld – violin
Omar Hakim – drums
Tamara Hatwan – violin
Jerry Hey – horn
Paul Jackson, Jr. – guitar
Patricia Johnson – violin
Will Kennedy – drums
Peter Kent – violin
Robbie Kondor – piano
Armen Ksadjikian – cello
Songa Lee – violin
Natalie Leggett – violin
Mario de León – violin
Jay Leonhart – bass
Phillip Levy – violin
Dan Little – cello
David Low – cello
Rene Mandel – violin
Andrew Martin – trombone
Arnold McCuller – backing vocals
Raul Midón – acoustic guitar, background vocals
Ricky Minor – bass
Victoria Miskolczy – viola
Shedrick Mitchell – organ
Horia Moroaica – violin
Ralph Morrison III – violin
Lewis Nash – drums
Dan Neufeld – viola
Robin Olson – violin
Sid Page – violin
Sara Parkins – violin
John Patitucci – bass
Valerie Pinkston – background vocals
Katia Popov – violin
Joe Porcaro – percussion
William Frank "Bill" Reichenbach Jr. – horn
Kevin Ricard – percussion
Emil Richards – vibraphone
John "J.R." Robinson – drums
Ralph Rolle – drums
Gil Romero – violin
James Ross – viola
Sheldon Sanov – violin
David Shamban – cello
Harry Shirinian – viola
Jackie Simley – background vocals
Steve Skinner – vibraphone
Pamela Sklar – bass flute
Neil Stubenhaus – bass
Cecilia Tsan – cello
Mari Tsumura – violin
Louise di Tullio – flute
Michael Valerio – bass
Josefina Vergara – violin
Frank Vignola – guitar
Ian Walker – string bass
Larry E. Williams – Saxophone
Lloyd Williams – background vocals
Reggie C. Young – trombone

Charts

Weekly charts

Year-end charts

Singles

Certifications

References

External links 

2004 albums
Queen Latifah albums
Albums produced by Arif Mardin
Albums produced by Ron Fair
Interscope Records albums
Traditional pop albums
Vocal jazz albums
Covers albums
Vector Recordings albums